The city government of New York City controls a budget of about $78.3 billion a year, as of 2016. Officials receive municipal funding for their campaigns, and are elected for a maximum of two terms. City government is dominated by the Democratic Party, which also normally attracts majority support within the city in State, Congressional, and Presidential elections. The suffrage has been extended in stages since the founding of the state: African-Americans (men only) received the vote in 1870 and women in 1920. Since 1968, electoral district boundaries at all levels have been drawn so as to ensure minority representation.

New York City politicians have often exerted lots of influence in other countries represented in the city's ethnic mix, as in the development of the MacBride Principles affecting employment practices in Northern Ireland.

The city contains many headquarters of Federal institutions and military installations like the Intrepid.

City budget

The New York City government's budget is the largest municipal budget in the United States. The city government will spend about $78.3 billion in 2016. It employs 250,000 people, spends $23.5 billion to educate more than 1.1 million children, levies $27 billion in taxes, and receives $14 billion from federal and state governments. New York State has more than 4,200 local governments in the form of counties, cities, towns, and villages. About 52% of all revenue raised by local governments in the state is raised solely by the government of New York City, which spends it on education (28%), social services (20%), public safety (13%), and benefits and pensions (10%). New York City property taxes are lower than those in the suburbs because most of the city's revenue comes from the city's sales tax and income tax.  New York city residents pay an income tax to the municipality, in addition to their New York state income taxes, based on brackets that range from 2.9% to 3.7% of state taxable income.  The city income tax also features a number of fully refundable tax credits, including an Earned Income Credit.

The city has a strong imbalance of payments with the federal and state governments. New York City receives 83 cents in services for every $1 it sends to Washington in taxes (or annually sends $13.1 billion more to Washington than it receives back). The city also sends an additional $11.1 billion more each year to the state of New York than it receives back. The city's total tax burden is among the highest in the United States.

Term limits and campaign finance

New York has a municipal campaign finance system. The New York City Campaign Finance Board (NYCCFB) gives public matching funds to qualifying candidates, who in exchange submit to strict contribution and spending limits and a full audit of their finances. Citywide candidates in the program are required to take part in debates. Corporate contributions are banned and political action committees must register with the city.

A two-term limit was imposed on most elected officials, including the Mayor and City Council, but excluding the Districts Attorney, after a 1993 referendum. In 1996, voters turned down a City Council proposal to extend term limits. The movement to introduce term limits was led by Ronald Lauder, a cosmetics heir, who spent $4 million on the two referendums.

In 2008 the City Council voted 29–22 to overturn two referendums and to extend the term limitation to three terms.

These limits were reinstated as part of a NYC Charter update voted in by the electorate.

The Democratic Party holds the majority of public offices. Sixty-eight percent of registered voters in the city are Democrats.  There are pockets of Republican strength in some sections of Brooklyn and Queens and a large Republican stronghold in the more Suburban Staten Island.

New York City has not been carried by a Republican in a statewide or presidential election since President Calvin Coolidge won the five boroughs in 1924. This is in contrast to New York State as a whole, which is somewhat less left-leaning (though it has trended Democratic in most recent elections). In 2014, Democrats had a supermajority in the New York State Assembly by virtue of holding all but two city-based districts.

Historically, the city's Republican officeholders have been considerably to the left of their national counterparts (with the significant exception of Staten Island). Labor and education politics are important. Housing and economic development are the most controversial topics, such as seen in the long debate over the building of the Barclays Center. An ability to deal with the state government is also crucial, especially on matters of education funding.

The Working Families Party, affiliated with the labor movement and progressive community activists, is a force in city politics. Party platforms are centered on affordable housing, education and economic development.

New York City is split between 12 of the state's 27 congressional districts, all but one held by Democrats.  The Democrats have been particularly dominant in the city's federal politics since the 1990s; even before then, Republicans only had a realistic chance at winning three of the city's districts.

Historically, the most conservative district in the city is that based in Staten Island and southern Brooklyn; until 2013 called New York's 13th congressional district. The district has been a reliably red bastion in a deep blue city, sending a Republican to Congress in every election since 1980 except 2008 and 2018. With former city councilman Michael McMahon's 2008 election victory in the district, Democrats took all of the city's congressional seats for the first time in 76 years. The status would be short-lived as Republican Michael Grimm defeated McMahon 2 years later to retake the seat in the 2010 midterms. Renamed in 2013 as New York's 11th congressional district, the seat would flip once more when Democrat Max Rose unseated Republican incumbent Dan Donovan in the 2018 midterm election. However, Democratic gain in the district proved ephemeral yet again. In the 2020 election, Republican Assemblywoman Nicole Malliotakis has reclaimed the GOP's sole House seat in New York City, again defeating a freshman Democratic incumbent, by a margin of 58% to 42%.

Due almost entirely to the Democrats' near-total dominance at the local level, the Democrats have held a majority of the state's congressional seats since the late 1950s.

Political influence

The Flushing Remonstrance signed by colonists in 1657 is considered a precursor to the United States Constitution's provision on freedom of religion in the Bill of Rights. The signers protested the Dutch colonial authorities' persecution of Quakers in what is today the borough of Queens.

New York City politicians often exert influence outside the city in response to the city's diverse ethnic constituencies. For example, in 1984 the New York City Comptroller’s Office under the direction of then Comptroller Harrison J. Goldin developed with Irish Nobel Peace laureate Seán MacBride the MacBride Principles, which call on companies operating in Northern Ireland to increase employment opportunities for members of underrepresented religious groups, ban the display of provocative sectarian emblems in the workplace, promote security for minority employees and abolish hiring criteria that discriminate on the basis of religion or ethnicity. A 2006 report by the New York City Comptroller's Office found that 88 US and Canadian corporations operating in Northern Ireland had agreed to independent monitoring of their compliance with the MacBride Principles.

Candidates running for parliament in countries like the Dominican Republic visit the large expatriate communities from their countries living in New York City to solicit donations and absentee votes. New York City mayors, in turn, visit these countries to build closer political and economic ties between the city and governments abroad.

Four of the top five zip codes in the United States for political contributions are in Manhattan. The top zip code, 10021 on the Upper East Side, generated the most money for the 2004 presidential campaigns of both George W. Bush and John Kerry.

In 2008 New York City and London announced the Innovation Exchange Programme, in which the two cities will share best practices in government innovation. The program involves not only the formal exchange of ideas but also transfer of personnel between the cities. It will focus on transparency and accountability, efficiency, transport, policy, education and skills and environmental policy.

Suffrage

In the 1820s, New York State removed all property qualifications for the right to vote for whites but retained them for blacks. In 1846 voters in New York State rejected a proposed amendment to the state constitution that would guarantee blacks the same voting rights as whites. In 1870, however, five years after the Civil War, the 15th Amendment to the U.S. Constitution was ratified, giving blacks throughout the United States the same voting rights as whites.

New York City introduced a uniform ballot listing all candidates in 1880. To get on it, an office seeker would have to be nominated by a political party or submit nominating petitions, laying the groundwork for a system that persists to this day. In 1894 bipartisan control of elections was introduced, establishing a system in effect to this day. All election positions, from Board of Elections commissioners to election inspectors, must be divided equally between the two major parties.

A voting machine developed by Jacob H. Myers, was used in Lockport, New York in 1892. By the early 1920s, voting machines would be used for all general elections in New York City.

A 1915 referendum giving women the vote was defeated by city and state voters, but in 1920 the 19th Amendment to the U.S. Constitution was signed into law, guaranteeing women throughout the United States the right to vote.

In 1967, a suit brought under the Voting Rights Act passed by the U.S. Congress two years earlier led to the creation of the majority black 12th Congressional District in Brooklyn. Previously, black voters had been divided among several predominantly white districts. Under the Act, Manhattan, Brooklyn, and the Bronx are subject to preclearance by the Department of Justice before implementing any changes affecting voting. In 1968, voters in the district elected Shirley Chisholm as the first black woman ever in the U.S. House of Representatives. Since then, congressional, state legislative and City Council districts have been drawn so as to ensure minority representation.

Non-citizens who have children in public schools were given the right to vote in elections for members of community school boards in 1969 (those boards no longer exist). Starting in 1975 election information was provided in Spanish as well as English, and in 1992 the City introduced ballots in Chinese.

As of May, 2013, a new bill has begun working its way through the NYC political system to allow non citizens living in the five boroughs the right to vote in local elections. It has enough projected votes in the NYC City Council to overrule an expected Mayoral veto. It is unclear whether this new law (if passed) will actually be valid.

In December 2021, the city council voted to allow non-citizens within New York City to vote in elections.

Federal representation

13 out of 27 congressional districts in the state have portions of New York City.

The United States Post Office operates post offices in New York City. The James A. Farley Post Office in Midtown Manhattan is the city's main post office. The post office stopped 24-hour service beginning on May 9, 2009 due to decreasing mail traffic. Brooklyn, The Bronx, and Staten Island each have central and/or main post offices. Queens has three, each serving one of the former townships of Queens County.

New York City also has federal buildings in downtown Manhattan that house buildings for the United States Attorney and the FBI.

New York's military installations include the United States Army post of Fort Hamilton located in the Bay Ridge section of Brooklyn under the shadow of the Verrazano-Narrows Bridge. The bridge spans the Narrows and connects to Staten Island, where Coast Guard base Fort Wadsworth lies under the bridge's shadow. Fort Totten is another military installation located in Queens near the Throggs Neck Bridge.

See also
New York City-related articles:
 Government of New York City
New York City mayoral elections
Tammany Hall
 Kings County Democratic Committee
 New York County Democratic Committee
 Government and politics in Brooklyn

New York State-related articles:
Elections in New York
Politics of New York (state)
American Labor Party
Conservative Party of New York
Independence Party of New York
Liberal Party of New York
New York State Right to Life Party
Working Families Party

References

 
Government of New York City